Strychnine (US chiefly  ) is a highly toxic, colorless, bitter, crystalline alkaloid used as a pesticide, particularly for killing small vertebrates such as birds and rodents. Strychnine, when inhaled, swallowed, or absorbed through the eyes or mouth, causes poisoning which results in muscular convulsions and eventually death through asphyxia.  While it is no longer used medicinally, it was used historically in small doses to strengthen muscle contractions, such as a heart and bowel stimulant and performance-enhancing drug. The most common source is from the seeds of the Strychnos nux-vomica tree.

Biosynthesis

Strychnine is a terpene indole alkaloid belonging to the Strychnos family of Corynanthe alkaloids, and it is derived from tryptamine and secologanin. The biosynthesis of strychine was solved in 2022. The enzyme, strictosidine synthase, catalyzes the condensation of tryptamine and secologanin, followed by a Pictet-Spengler reaction to form strictosidine. Many steps have been inferred by isolation of intermediates from Strychnos nux-vomica. The next step is hydrolysis of the acetal, which opens the ring by elimination of glucose (O-Glu) and provides a reactive aldehyde. The nascent aldehyde is then attacked by a secondary amine to afford geissoschizine, a common intermediate of many related compounds in the Strychnos family.

A reverse Pictet-Spengler reaction cleaves the C2–C3 bond, while subsequently forming the C3–C7 bond via a 1,2-alkyl migration, an oxidation from a cytochrome P450 enzyme to a spiro-oxindole, nucleophilic attack from the enol at C16, and elimination of oxygen forms the C2–C16 bond to provide dehydropreakuammicine. Hydrolysis of the methyl ester and decarboxylation leads to norfluorocurarine. Stereospecific reduction of the endocyclic double bond by NADPH and hydroxylation provides the Wieland-Gumlich aldehyde, which was first isolated by Heimberger and Scott in 1973, although previously synthesized by Wieland and Gumlich in 1932. To elongate the appendage by 2 carbons, acetyl-CoA is added to the aldehyde in an aldol reaction to afford prestrychnine. Strychnine is then formed by a facile addition of the amine with the carboxylic acid or its activated CoA thioester, followed by ring-closure via displacement of an activated alcohol.

Chemical synthesis

As early researchers noted, the strychnine molecular structure, with its specific array of rings, stereocenters, and nitrogen functional groups, is a complex synthetic target, and has stimulated interest for that reason and for interest in the structure-activity relationships underlying its pharmacologic activities. An early synthetic chemist targeting strychnine, R.B. Woodward, quoted the chemist who determined its structure through chemical decomposition and related physical studies as saying that "for its molecular size it is the most complex organic substance known" (attributed to Sir Robert Robinson).

The first total synthesis of strychnine was reported by the research group of R. B. Woodward in 1954, and is considered a classic in this field. The Woodward account published in 1954 was very brief (3 pp.), but was followed by a 42-page report in 1963. The molecule has since received continuing wide attention in the years since for the challenges to synthetic organic strategy and tactics presented by its complexity; its synthesis has been targeted and its stereocontrolled  preparation independently achieved by more than a dozen research groups since the first success (see main strychnine total synthesis article).

Mechanism of action
Strychnine is a neurotoxin which acts as an antagonist of glycine and acetylcholine receptors. It primarily affects the motor nerve fibers in the spinal cord which control muscle contraction. An impulse is triggered at one end of a nerve cell by the binding of neurotransmitters to the receptors. In the presence of an inhibitory neurotransmitter, such as glycine, a greater quantity of excitatory neurotransmitters must bind to receptors before an action potential is generated. Glycine acts primarily as an agonist of the glycine receptor, which is a ligand-gated chloride channel in neurons located in the spinal cord and in the brain. This chloride channel allows the negatively charged chloride ions into the neuron, causing a hyperpolarization which pushes the membrane potential further from threshold. Strychnine is an antagonist of glycine; it binds noncovalently to the same receptor, preventing the inhibitory effects of glycine on the postsynaptic neuron. Therefore, action potentials are triggered with lower levels of excitatory neurotransmitters. When the inhibitory signals are prevented, the motor neurons are more easily activated and the victim has spastic muscle contractions, resulting in death by asphyxiation. Strychnine binds the Aplysia californica acetylcholine binding protein (a homolog of nicotinic receptors) with high affinity but low specificity, and does so in multiple conformations.

Toxicity

In high doses, strychnine is very toxic to humans (minimum lethal oral dose in adults is 30–120 mg) and many other animals (oral  = 16 mg/kg in rats, 2 mg/kg in mice), and poisoning by inhalation, swallowing, or absorption through eyes or mouth can be fatal. S. nux-vomica seeds are generally effective as a poison only when they are crushed or chewed before swallowing because the pericarp is quite hard and indigestible; poisoning symptoms may therefore not appear if the seeds are ingested whole.

Animal toxicity
Strychnine poisoning in animals usually occurs from ingestion of baits designed for use against gophers, moles, and coyotes. Strychnine is also used as a rodenticide, but is not specific to such unwanted pests and may kill other small animals. In the United States, most baits containing strychnine have been replaced with zinc phosphide baits since 1990. In the European Union, rodenticides with strychnine are forbidden since 2006. Some animals are immune to strychnine; usually these are species such as fruit bats that have evolved resistance to poisonous alkaloids in the fruit they eat. The drugstore beetle has a symbiotic gut yeast that allows it to digest pure strychnine.

Strychnine toxicity in rats is dependent on sex. It is more toxic to females than to males when administered via subcutaneous injection or intraperitoneal injection. Differences are due to higher rates of metabolism by male rat liver microsomes. Dogs and cats are more susceptible among domestic animals, pigs are believed to be as susceptible as dogs, and horses are able to tolerate relatively large amounts of strychnine. Birds affected by strychnine poisoning exhibit wing droop, salivation, tremors, muscle tenseness, and convulsions. Death occurs as a result of respiratory arrest. The clinical signs of strychnine poisoning relate to its effects on the central nervous system. The first clinical signs of poisoning include nervousness, restlessness, twitching of the muscles, and stiffness of the neck. As the poisoning progresses, the muscular twitching becomes more pronounced and convulsions suddenly appear in all the skeletal muscles. The limbs are extended and the neck is curved to opisthotonus. The pupils are widely dilated. As death approaches, the convulsions follow one another with increased rapidity, severity, and duration. Death results from asphyxia due to prolonged paralysis of the respiratory muscles. Following the ingestion of strychnine, symptoms of poisoning usually appear within 15 to 60 min. The LD50-values for strychnine in animals are listed below in table 1.

Human toxicity

After injection, inhalation, or ingestion, the first symptoms to appear are generalized muscle spasms. They appear very quickly after inhalation or injection – within as few as five minutes – and take somewhat longer to manifest after ingestion, typically approximately 15 minutes. With a very high dose, the onset of respiratory failure and brain death can occur in 15 to 30 minutes. If a lower dose is ingested, other symptoms begin to develop, including seizures, cramping, stiffness, hypervigilance, and agitation. Seizures caused by strychnine poisoning can start as early as 15 minutes after exposure and last 12–24 hours. They are often triggered by sights, sounds, or touch and can cause other adverse symptoms, including hyperthermia, rhabdomyolysis, myoglobinuric kidney failure, metabolic acidosis, and respiratory acidosis. During seizures, mydriasis (abnormal dilation), exophthalmos (protrusion of the eyes), and nystagmus (involuntary eye movements) may occur.

As strychnine poisoning progresses, tachycardia (rapid heart beat), hypertension (high blood pressure), tachypnea (rapid breathing), cyanosis (blue discoloration), diaphoresis (sweating), water-electrolyte imbalance, leukocytosis (high number of white blood cells), trismus (lockjaw), risus sardonicus (spasm of the facial muscles), and opisthotonus (dramatic spasm of the back muscles, causing arching of the back and neck) can occur. In rare cases, the affected person may experience nausea or vomiting.

The proximate cause of death in strychnine poisoning can be cardiac arrest, respiratory failure, multiple organ failure, or brain damage.

The minimum lethal dose values estimated from different cases of strychnine poisoning are listed below in table 2.

For occupational exposures to strychnine, the Occupational Safety and Health Administration and the National Institute for Occupational Safety and Health have set exposure limits at 0.15 mg/m3 over an 8-hour work day.

Because strychnine produces some of the most dramatic and painful symptoms of any known toxic reaction, strychnine poisoning is often portrayed in literature and film including authors Agatha Christie and Arthur Conan Doyle.

Pharmacokinetics

Absorption
Strychnine may be introduced into the body orally, by inhalation, or by injection. It is a potently bitter substance, and in humans has been shown to activate bitter taste receptors TAS2R10 and TAS2R46. Strychnine is rapidly absorbed from the gastrointestinal tract.

Distribution
Strychnine is transported by plasma and erythrocytes. Due to slight protein binding, strychnine leaves the bloodstream quickly and distributes to the tissues. Approximately 50% of the ingested dose can enter the tissues in 5 minutes. Also within a few minutes of ingestion, strychnine can be detected in the urine. Little difference was noted between oral and intramuscular administration of strychnine in a 4 mg dose. In persons killed by strychnine, the highest concentrations are found in the blood, liver, kidney and stomach wall. The usual fatal dose is 60–100 mg strychnine and is fatal after a period of 1–2 hours, though lethal doses vary depending on the individual.

Metabolism
Strychnine is rapidly metabolized by the liver microsomal enzyme system requiring NADPH and O2.  Strychnine competes with the inhibitory neurotransmitter glycine resulting in an excitatory state. However, the toxicokinetics after overdose have not been well described. In most severe cases of strychnine poisoning, the patient dies before reaching the hospital. The biological half-life of strychnine is about 10 hours. This half-life suggests that normal hepatic function can efficiently degrade strychnine even when the quantity ingested is high enough to cause severe poisoning.

Excretion
A few minutes after ingestion, strychnine is excreted unchanged in the urine, and accounts for about 5 to 15% of a sublethal dose given over 6 hours. Approximately 10 to 20% of the dose will be excreted unchanged in the urine in the first 24 hours. The percentage excreted decreases with the increasing dose. Of the amount excreted by the kidneys, about 70% is excreted in the first 6 hours, and almost 90% in the first 24 hours. Excretion is virtually complete in 48 to 72 hours.

Treatment

There is no specific antidote for strychnine but recovery from exposure is possible with early supportive medical treatment. Strychnine poisoning demands aggressive management with early control of muscle spasms, intubation for loss of airway control, toxin removal (decontamination), intravenous hydration and potentially active cooling efforts in the context of hyperthermia as well as hemodialysis in kidney failure (strychnine has not been shown to be removed by hemodialysis). Strychnine poisoning in today's age generally results from herbal remedies and strychnine-containing rodenticides. Moreover, management should be tailored to the patient's history of chief complaint and workup to rule out other causes.  If a poisoned person is able to survive for 6 to 12 hours subsequent to initial dose, they have a good prognosis. The patient should be kept in a quiet and darkened room, because excessive manipulation and loud noises may cause convulsions. Because these convulsions are extremely painful, appropriate analgesics should be administered. Treatment of strychnine poisoning involves oral administration of activated charcoal which adsorbs strychnine within the digestive tract; unabsorbed strychnine is removed from the stomach by gastric lavage, along with tannic acid or potassium permanganate solutions to oxidize strychnine. Activated charcoal may be beneficial, but its benefit remains unproven, and its use should be avoided in any patient with a tenuous airway or altered mental status. Seizures are controlled by anticonvulsants such as phenobarbital or diazepam, along with muscle relaxants such as dantrolene to combat muscle rigidity. Historically chloroform or heavy doses of chloral, bromide, urethane or amyl nitrite were used to restrain the convulsions. Because medications such as diazepam are not effective to relieve convulsions in all cases, concurrent use of barbiturates and/or propofol can be utilized.

The sine qua non of strychnine toxicity is the "awake" seizure, in which tonic-clonic activity occurs but the patient is alert and oriented throughout and afterwards. Accordingly, George Harley (1829–1896) showed in 1850 that curare (wourali) was effective for the treatment of tetanus and strychnine poisoning. Curare causes paralysis, and it is important to note that, if seizure activity is present, the use of muscle paralysis will only mask the signs of ongoing seizure activity despite otherwise ongoing present brain damage.

History
Strychnine was the first alkaloid to be identified in plants of the genus Strychnos, family Loganiaceae. Strychnos, named by Carl Linnaeus in 1753, is a genus of trees and climbing shrubs of the Gentianales order. The genus contains 196 various species and is distributed throughout the warm regions of Asia (58 species), America (64 species), and Africa (75 species). The seeds and bark of many plants in this genus contain strychnine.

The toxic and medicinal effects of Strychnos nux-vomica have been well known from the times of ancient India, although the chemical compound itself was not identified and characterized until the 19th century. The inhabitants of these countries had historical knowledge of the species Strychnos nux-vomica and Saint-Ignatius' bean (Strychnos ignatii). The tree has a crooked, short, thick trunk and the wood is close grained and very durable. The fruit has an orange color and is about the size of a large apple with a hard rind and contains five seeds, which are covered with a soft wool-like substance. The ripe seeds look like flattened disks, which are very hard. These seeds are the chief commercial source of strychnine and were first imported to and marketed in Europe as a poison to kill rodents and small predators. Strychnos ignatii is a woody climbing shrub of the Philippines. The fruit of the plant, known as Saint Ignatius' bean, contains as many as 25 seeds embedded in the pulp. The seeds contain more strychnine than other commercial alkaloids. The properties of S. nux-vomica and S. ignatii are substantially those of the alkaloid strychnine.

Strychnine was first discovered by French chemists Joseph Bienaimé Caventou and Pierre-Joseph Pelletier in 1818 in the Saint-Ignatius' bean. In some Strychnos plants a 9,10-dimethoxy derivative of strychnine, the alkaloid brucine, is also present. Brucine is not as poisonous as strychnine. Historic records indicate that preparations containing strychnine (presumably) had been used to kill dogs, cats, and birds in Europe as far back as 1640. It was also used during World War II by the Dirlewanger Brigade against civilian population.

The structure of strychnine was first determined in 1946 by Sir Robert Robinson and in 1954 this alkaloid was synthesized in a laboratory by Robert B. Woodward. This is one of the most famous syntheses in the history of organic chemistry. Both chemists won the Nobel prize (Robinson in 1947 and Woodward in 1965).

Strychnine has been used as a plot device in the author Agatha Christie's murder mysteries.

Performance enhancer
Strychnine was popularly used as an athletic performance enhancer and recreational stimulant in the late 19th century and early 20th century, due to its convulsant effects. One notorious instance of its use was during the 1904 Olympics marathon, when track-and-field athlete Thomas Hicks was unwillingly administered a concoction of egg whites and brandy laced with a small amount of strychnine by his assistants to boost his stamina. Hicks won the race, but was hallucinating by the time he reached the finish line, and soon after collapsed. Maximilian Theodor Buch proposed it as a cure for alcoholism around the same time. It was thought to be similar to coffee. Its effects are well-described in H. G. Wells' novella The Invisible Man: the title character states "Strychnine is a grand tonic ... to take the flabbiness out of a man." Dr Kemp, an acquaintance replies: "It's the devil, ... It's the palaeolithic in a bottle."

See also 
 Strychnine poisoning
 Avicide
 "Poisoning Pigeons in the Park"
 The Mysterious Affair at Styles
 The Sonics "Strychnine"

References 

Plant toxins
Convulsants
Lactams
Indole alkaloids
Avicides
Bitter compounds
Glycine receptor antagonists
Ethers
Nitrogen heterocycles
Oxygen heterocycles
Neurotoxins
Chloride channel blockers
Strychnine poisoning